Pola is a station on the Buenos Aires Premetro. After this station, the line branches off into two routes to its two southerly terminals. It was opened on 7 November 2006. The station is located in the Barrio of Villa Lugano, near a large social housing complex.

References

External links

Buenos Aires PreMetro stations
Buenos Aires Underground stations
Railway stations opened in 2006